Beriain (also San Donato after the chapel at the top) is a 1,493 metres high peak part of the Basque Mountains range, located in the Andia range of western Navarre, Spain. Its sharp profile is an iconic image in the Burunda and Barranca valleys that link Vitoria-Gasteiz and Pamplona. The peak is located at the center of the traditional Basque Country provinces.

References

External links

Urbasa-Andia Natural Park

Basque Mountains
Mountains of Navarre